The 1971 Hawaii Rainbows football team represented the University of Hawaiʻi at Mānoa as an independent during the 1971 NCAA College Division football season. In their fourth season under head coach Dave Holmes, the Rainbows compiled a 7–4 record.

Schedule

References

Hawaii
Hawaii Rainbow Warriors football seasons
Hawaii Rainbows football